Aconitum fischeri is a species of flowering plant of the genus Aconitum, in the buttercup family, Ranunculaceae. It is native to Korea and Siberia and cultivated in gardens in temperate zones for its showy flowers. Plants bloom from early to late summer. The plant contains poisonous aconite, but according to ancient Chinese medical lore, if it is carefully measured, prepared, and used, it is believed to be beneficial in the treatment of colds, coughs, and fevers. If the measuring is in the slightest degree inaccurate, however, it is pure poison. The plant is susceptible to downy mildew caused by the oomycete species Peronospora aconiti.

References

fisceri